Shō Aikawa may refer to:

 Show Aikawa (born 1961), Japanese male actor and composer
 Shō Aikawa (screenwriter) (born 1965), Japanese screenwriter